Nemertodermatidae is a family of wormlike animals in the phylum Acoelomorpha. They are similar to the flatworms of the phylum Platyhelminthes, and were traditionally classified as such.

These are hermaphroditic marine worms with ciliated bodies containing a "sack-like gut".

There are four genera:

 Meara
Meara stichopi Westblad 1949
Nemertinoides
 Nemertinoides elongatus Riser 1987
 Nemertinoides glandulosum
 Nemertinoides wolfgangi
 Nemertoderma
 Nemertoderma bathycola Steinböck 1930
 Nemertoderma westbladi (Westblad) Steinbock, 1938
 Sterreria
 Sterreria boucheti 
 Sterreria lundini 
 Sterreria martindalei 
 Sterreria monolithes 
 Sterreria papuensis 
 Sterreria psammicola (Sterrer 1970)
 Sterreria rubra 
 Sterreria variabilis 
 Sterreria ylvae

References

Acoelomorphs